"Pocket" is Ai Otsuka's 16th (17th overall) single released under the avex trax label. It is her third (fourth) single to be released in 2007. This is her first single to be released after her fourth album, approximately two months after Love Piece. This is Otsuka's first original single since her debut single "Momo no hanabira", which sold 44,822 copies, to sell less than 100,000 copies.

Track listing

Charts 
Oricon Sales Chart (Japan)

References

Ai Otsuka songs
2007 singles
Songs written by Ai Otsuka
2007 songs
Avex Trax singles